John Robinson McCravy III (born September 6, 1958) is an American attorney and politician. He is a member of the South Carolina House of Representatives from the 13th District, serving since 2016. He is a member of the Republican party. In addition to serving in the State House, McCravy is an attorney and teaches law at Lander University.

He is the grandson of state legislator John R. McCravy.

Electoral history

2012 SC House of Representatives
McCravy's first run for office was for the seat of outgoing incumbent Lewis Pinson in 2012. He was defeated in the Republican primary.

2016 SC House of Representatives
McCravy was the only Republican to run in 2016, so there was no Republican primary. He defeated Democrat Michael Gaskin in the general election.

2018 SC House of Representatives
McCravy was the only Republican to run in 2018, so there was no Republican primary. The 2018 general election was a rematch from 2016; McCravy defeated Gaskin by a similar margin.

References

Living people
1958 births
Republican Party members of the South Carolina House of Representatives
21st-century American politicians
Clemson University alumni
University of South Carolina alumni